Cooplacurripa is a small rural locality, located 40 kilometres from Nowendoc, New South Wales.Cooplacurripa is home to the Cooplacurripa Station.

Cooplacurripa River, of the Manning River catchment, flows through the area.

In 2016, the population of Cooplacurripa was 12.

The area is accessible via Nowendoc Road, a 32 kilometre drive.

References

Populated places established in 1857
1857 establishments in Australia